Léon Thiércelin was a Haitian fencer. He competed in the individual masters foil and épée events at the 1900 Summer Olympics.

References

External links
 

Year of birth missing
Year of death missing
Haitian male épée fencers
Olympic fencers of Haiti
Fencers at the 1900 Summer Olympics
Haitian male foil fencers
Place of birth missing
Place of death missing